Icius mbitaensis is a jumping spider species in the genus Icius that lives in Kenya. It was first described by Wanda Wesołowska in 2011.

References

Endemic fauna of Kenya
Salticidae
Fauna of Kenya
Spiders of Africa
Spiders described in 2011
Taxa named by Wanda Wesołowska